Euparkeria (meaning "Parker's good animal", named in honor of W.K. Parker) is an extinct genus of archosauriform reptile from the Triassic of South Africa. Euparkeria is close to the ancestry of Archosauria, the reptile group that includes crocodilians, pterosaurs, and dinosaurs (including birds).

Fossils of Euparkeria, including nearly complete skeletons, have been recovered from the Cynognathus Assemblage Zone (CAZ, also known as the Burgersdorp Formation), which hosts the oldest advanced archosauriforms in the fossil-rich Karoo Basin. Tentative dating schemes place the CAZ around the latest Early Triassic (late Olenekian stage) or earliest Middle Triassic (early Anisian stage), approximately 247 million years old. 

Euparkeria is among the most heavily described and discussed non-archosaur archosauriforms. It was a small carnivorous reptile with a boxy skull, slender limbs, and two rows of tiny teardrop-shaped osteoderms (bony scutes) along its backbone. Euparkeria is a eucrocopod, meaning that it was among the reptiles most closely related to true crown group archosaurs, according to specializations of the ankle and hindlimbs. The hind limbs were slightly longer than its forelimbs, which has been taken as evidence that it may have been able to rear up on its hind legs as a facultative biped. This conception supplemented older studies which interpreted Euparkeria as a particularly close relative to fully bipedal early dinosaurs. Its normal movement was probably more quadrupedal, with limbs positioned in a semi-erect posture, analogous (but not identical) to a crocodilian high walk. Biomechanical analyses suggests that Euparkeria was incapable of even short periods of bipedal activity.

Palaeobiology

Locomotion
The hind limbs of Euparkeria are somewhat longer than its forelimbs, which has led some researchers to conclude that it could have occasionally walked on its hind legs as a facultative biped. Other possible adaptations to bipedalism in Euparkeria include rows of osteoderms that could stabilize the back and a long tail that could act as a counterbalance to the rest of the body. Paleontologist Rosalie Ewer suggested in 1965 that Euparkeria spent most of its time on four legs but moved on its hind legs whilst running. 
However, adaptations to bipedalism in Euparkeria are not as obvious as they are in some other Triassic archosauriforms such as dinosaurs and poposauroids; the forelimbs are still relatively long and the head is so large that the tail might not have effectively counterbalanced its weight. The position of muscle anchorage points on the humerus or thigh bones suggest that Euparkeria could not have held its legs in a fully erect posture beneath its body, but would have held them slightly out to the side as in modern crocodilians and most other quadrupedal Triassic archosauriforms. Euparkeria has a large backward-pointing projection on the calcaneum (an ankle bone) that would have given strong leverage to the ankle during locomotion. A calcaneal projection might have enabled Euparkeria to move with all four limbs in a semi-erect "high walk" similar to the way in which living crocodilians sometimes move about on land.

A 2020 study of range of motion in the hindlimbs of Euparkeria found conflicting evidence for its posture. The structure of the femur (thigh bone) and hip socket suggest that the legs were capable of a very wide range of motion, ranging from a nearly vertical stance to a thigh which projects forwards, backwards, or outwards at a nearly horizontal angle. Rotation of the thigh was more limited, a factor that argues against a sprawling gait reliant on broad outward leg sweeps. Although the hip socket argues in favor of an upright 'pillar-erect' hindlimb stance, the structure of the tibia (inner shin bone) and ankle show that the lower legs and feet would have splayed outwards during normal usage, supporting a semi-erect rather than fully erect stance. The hindlimbs of Euparkeria have been used to argue that the evolution of a fully erect gait in true archosaurs was a stepwise process which first developed in bones closer to the hip.

A 2023 paper analyzed the possibility of facultative bipedalism and came to the conclusion that Euparkeria was quadrupedal at all times. Models of weight distribution found that the center of mass for Euparkeria was far in front of the hips, meaning that a body held horizontally during a bipedal stance would have to fight against a very large forward pitching moment. This pitching moment far exceeds that of modern long-limbed lizards capable of facultative bipedalism. The pitching moment would only stabilize if the body was held up at an implausibly high angle (>60 degrees), regardless of how the tail was held. In addition, models of muscle activation indicate that the ankle plantarflexor group (the muscles which bend the foot down to maintain stability) would have been overexerted to the point of failure if a bipedal posture was attempted by the animal.

Nocturnality
Some specimens of Euparkeria preserve bony rings in the eye sockets called sclerotic rings, which in life would have supported the eye. The sclerotic ring of Euparkeria is most similar to those of modern birds and reptiles that are nocturnal, suggesting that Euparkeria had a lifestyle adapted to low light conditions. During the Early Triassic the Karoo Basin was at about 65 degrees south latitude, meaning that Euparkeria would have experienced long periods of darkness in winter months.

Classification

The family Euparkeriidae is named after Euparkeria. The family name was first proposed by German paleontologist Friedrich von Huene in 1920; Huene classified euparkeriids as members of Pseudosuchia, a traditional name for crocodilian relatives from the Triassic (Pseudosuchia means "false crocodiles"). Early phylogenetic analyses created by Jacques Gauthier in the 1980s provided an alternative hypothesis, that Euparkeria was closer to dinosaurs (including birds) rather than crocodilians. Many genera have been assigned to Euparkeriidae in the past, but only two other valid genera are currently believed to be part of the family, apart from Euparkeria itself: Halazhaisuchus and Osmolskina.

More recent analyses starting with Benton & Clark (1988) place Euparkeria as a member of Archosauriformes in a position outside both crocodilian-line and bird-line (Avemetatarsalian). Although the ancestor to archosaurs likely shared several similarities with Euparkeria, archosaurs are probably not directly descendants of the genus. The precise placement of Euparkeria and other euparkeriids within Archosauriformes is controversial. 

Most analyses agree that Euparkeria was a closer relative of archosaurs than the proterosuchids or erythrosuchids were. The one exception is the study of Dilkes & Sues (2009), who found Euparkeria to be less crownward than Erythrosuchus. Nevertheless, these results have not been widely accepted. There still remains some ambiguity over whether Euparkeriidae was truly the sister group of the archosaurs. Many phylogenetic analyses place the long-snouted proterochampsians as more closely related to archosaurs than euparkeriids were. Such studies include Sereno (1991), Parrish (1993), Juul (1994), various analyses by Michael J. Benton, and Ezcurra (2016).

On the other hand, several other notable studies consider Euparkeria to be closer to archosaurs than proterochampsians. Sterling Nesbitt's influential 2011 monograph on archosaurian relationships found a similar result, although he also placed phytosaurs as the sister group to Archosauria, rather than Euparkeria.  Roland Sookias, a paleontologist responsible for many studies on euparkeriids in the 2010s, also considers them to be closer archosaur relatives than the proterochampsians. Like Nesbitt (2011), he found phytosaurs to be the closest relatives of Archosauria, followed by the Euparkeria-like reptile Dorosuchus, and then by the euparkeriids.

References

Prehistoric archosauriforms
Prehistoric reptile genera
Middle Triassic reptiles of Africa
Triassic South Africa
Fossils of South Africa
Fossil taxa described in 1913
Taxa named by Robert Broom